Follow the Crowd may refer to:

 Follow the Crowd (film), a 1918 film starring Harold Lloyd
 "Follow the Crowd" (song), a 1914 song composed by Irving Berlin